Lanima may refer to:

 Lanima people, a former ethnic group of Australia
 Lanima language, an extinct Australian language

See also 
 
 Lamina (disambiguation)